Dead Ringer is the second studio album by Meat Loaf, released on September 4, 1981. It is the second of four albums written entirely by Jim Steinman. The album cover was designed by comic book artist and horror illustrator Bernie Wrightson.

Album background
Steinman started to work on Bad for Good, the album that was supposed to be the follow-up to 1977's Bat Out of Hell, in 1978. During that time, a combination of touring, drugs and exhaustion had caused Meat Loaf to lose his voice. Without a singer, and pressured by the record company, Steinman decided that he should sing on Bad for Good himself, and write a new album for Meat Loaf. This album was Dead Ringer, which was later released in 1981, after the release of Bad for Good.

After playing the role of Travis Redfish in the movie Roadie, Meat Loaf got his voice back, got off drugs, played softball, and started to work on his new album in 1980. Steinman had written five new songs which, in addition to a new, re-recorded version of "More Than You Deserve" (which Meat Loaf had sung in the musical with the same name) and a reworked monologue, formed the album Dead Ringer. The album was produced by Meat Loaf and Stephan Galfas, with backing tracks produced by Jimmy Iovine and Steinman.

Four singles were released from Dead Ringer: "Dead Ringer for Love" (featuring Cher), "I'm Gonna Love Her for Both of Us", "Read 'Em and Weep" and "Peel Out". The album reached number 1 in the UK.

The tour for this album also marked the beginning of his long-running collaboration with pianist Paul Jacobs, as both sideman and songwriter.

Reception
Dead Ringer was considered both a commercial and critical disappointment after the worldwide success of Meat Loaf's debut album Bat Out of Hell.  Parke Puterbaugh of Rolling Stone called the album a "cast-iron drag" and chastised Meat Loaf for his "alarmingly awful" vocals.

Track listing

Personnel

Arrangements
Roy Bittan – co-arranger
Tom Malone – horn arrangements (7)
Alden Shuman, Roy Straigis – string arrangements (3, 8)

Band
Meat Loaf – lead vocals
Davey Johnstone – guitars
Mick Ronson – guitars (3)
Joe DeAngelis – acoustic guitars (1)
Steve Buslowe – bass guitar
Roy Bittan – piano, keyboards (1, 2, 8)
Nicky Hopkins – piano (3)
Larry Fast – synthesizers (1, 6)
Lou Del Gatto, Tom Malone, Lou Marini, Alan Rubin – horns (7)
Max Weinberg – drums
Liberty DeVitto – drums (5, 7)
Jimmy Maelen – percussion, African logs (7)
Leslie Aday – female voice (1)
Jim Steinman – spoken word (6)
Cher – guest vocals (7)
Rhonda Coullet (7), Rory Dodd, Ted Neeley, Allan F. Nicholls, Eric Troyer – vocals

Charts and certifications

Weekly charts

Certifications and sales

References

1981 albums
Meat Loaf albums
Epic Records albums